Omogo No.3 Dam is a gravity dam located in Ehime Prefecture in Japan. The dam is used for power production. The catchment area of the dam is 632.6 km2. The dam impounds about 44  ha of land when full and can store 6218 thousand cubic meters of water. The construction of the dam was started on 1978 and completed in 1984.

References

Dams in Ehime Prefecture
1984 establishments in Japan